Loxospora ochrophaea is a species of crustose lichen in the family Sarrameanaceae.

Taxonomy
It was first described scientifically by American lichenologist Edward Tuckerman in 1848 as Biatora ochrophaea. It has been shuffled to various genera in its taxonomic history, including Lecanora, Haematomma, and Lecania. Richard Harris proposed a transfer to Loxospora in 1990.

Description
Loxospora ochrophaea has a crust-like thallus that is light gray to green with a warty texture. It has peach-coloured apothecia that have a white margin. The lichen contains thamnolic acid and zeorin as secondary compounds. Found in North America, it grows on bark.

References

Lecanoromycetes
Lichen species
Lichens described in 1848
Taxa named by Edward Tuckerman
Fungi of North America